Kuźnia Raciborska  is a town in Racibórz County, Silesian Voivodeship, Poland, with 5,359 inhabitants (2019).

Twin towns – sister cities
See twin towns of Gmina Kuźnia Raciborska.

References

External links
Official town webpage

Cities and towns in Silesian Voivodeship
Racibórz County